Suomu is an alpine ski resort in the Lapland province of Finland, near the municipality of Kemijärvi. 

Suomu first opened in 1965. The resort is sometimes known as "the Arctic Circle Ski resort" because of its close proximity to the major northern circle of latitude.

External links

Ski areas and resorts in Finland
Buildings and structures in Lapland (Finland)
Tourist attractions in Lapland (Finland)